Matthew Colin "Matt" Ryan (born February 19, 1966), a native of New York, was captain of the 1996 US Olympic handball team.  He was a member of the US National team from 1989-1996 and he competed at the Goodwill Games in 1994 where the US team ranked 6 of 6.  He played basketball for the University of Massachusetts Amherst and Long Island University.

Awards
1 x Suffolk Sports Hall of Fame
3 x USA Player of the Year

References

External links
 

1966 births
Living people
American male handball players
Olympic handball players of the United States
Handball players at the 1996 Summer Olympics
Competitors at the 1994 Goodwill Games
Pan American Games bronze medalists for the United States
Medalists at the 1991 Pan American Games
Pan American Games medalists in handball